Mount Allen is the name of several places and things worldwide:

Places
In Antarctica
Mount Allen (Ellsworth Mountains)
Mount Allen (Victoria Land)

In Australia
Mount Allen, New South Wales
Mount Allen (Station), Northern Territory, a former pastoral lease on which Yuelamu is located (also spelt Allan)

In Canada
Mount Allen (Canada), a mountain located on the Continental Divide and British Columbia-Alberta border in Canada

in New Zealand
Mount Allen, Otago, outside of Dunedin
Mount Allen, Stewart Island
Mount Allen, West Coast

in the United States
Mount Allen, also known as Sandstone Peak, in the Santa Monica Mountains, California
Mount Allen, Pennsylvania

Other
Mount Allen Junior College, former name of Mount Olive College, North Carolina
"Mount Allen", a song by Economy Wolf

See also
Mount Allan (disambiguation)
Allen Mountain (disambiguation)
Allen Peak
Mount Allen Young, Antarctica